Burch Avenue Historic District, also known as the West End, is a national historic district located at Durham, Durham County, North Carolina, United States. The district encompasses 156 contributing buildings in a predominantly residential section of Durham. The buildings primarily date between about 1890 and 1960 and include notable examples of Queen Anne, Colonial Revival, and Bungalow / American Craftsman architecture.

It was listed on the National Register of Historic Places in 2010.

Notable buildings 
 William Thomas O'Brien House
 Immaculate Conception Catholic Church

References

Historic districts on the National Register of Historic Places in North Carolina
Queen Anne architecture in North Carolina
Colonial Revival architecture in North Carolina
Historic districts in Durham, North Carolina
National Register of Historic Places in Durham County, North Carolina
Neighborhoods in Durham, North Carolina